Jeff Kanipe (born September 8, 1953, in Corpus Christi, Texas) is an American science writer and author of astronomy books.

Biography 
Jeff received a degree in journalism from the University of Texas at Austin. He has been a science writer and editor for over 25 years, working as an editor for several space magazines including StarDate and Astronomy.
For a period in the early 2000s he served as skywatching columnist at SPACE.com and host of the popular Ask the Astronomer forum. Occasionally he writes articles for such sites as well as scholarly magazines like Nature, but his real passion is writing astronomy books. He is a member of the American Astronomical Society and the Authors Guild.

Asteroid 84447 Jeffkanipe is named in his honor, for his discovery of the earliest known prediscovery image of the asteroid, previously known as 2002 TU240.

Family 
Jeff is married to Alexandra Witze, a correspondent for Nature magazine. They live in Boulder, Colorado, where Jeff is sometimes interviewed on astronomy topics for the Boulder Daily Camera. Jeff has two daughters: Hayley Bond, an archaeologist, and Carly Kanipe, a veterinary pathologist. His brother, David Kanipe, is a former NASA engineer and retired from teaching aerospace engineering at Texas A&M University in College Station.

Books 
 Annals of the Deep Sky: A Survey of Galactic and Extragalactic Objects (Ongoing series that began in 2015, Willmann-Bell, with Dennis Webb)
 Island on Fire: The Extraordinary Story of A Forgotten Volcano That Changed the World (2015, Pegasus Books, with Alexandra Witze)
 The Cosmic Connection: How Astronomical Events Impact Life on Earth (2009, Prometheus Books)
 The Arp Atlas of Peculiar Galaxies: A Chronicle and Observer's Guide (2007, Willmann-Bell)
 Chasing Hubble's Shadows: The Search for Galaxies at the Edge of Time (2006, Farrar Straus Giroux)
 Astronomy: The Definitive Guide (2003, Barnes & Noble Books)
 Star and Sky (2000, Discovery Insight Guides)
 A Skywatcher's Year (1999, Cambridge University Press)
 Advanced Skywatching (1997, Weldon Owen)

References

External links
Author's website

American male non-fiction writers
Living people
1953 births
American astronomers